This is a list of city and town halls in England. The list is sortable by building age and height and provides a link to the listing description where relevant. Where the architect is not from the locality of the town hall, their hometown is included.

See also 

 List of city and town halls

 
England